Whitewater Falls is a series of waterfalls and cascades on the Whitewater River in North Carolina and South Carolina. Over the  course of the river between the two falls, the Whitewater River drops , and crosses the state border. Both Falls can be hiked to via the Foothills Trail or spur trails.
Lookouts allow you to view both falls.

 Upper Whitewater Falls - the taller of the two falls , Nantahala National Forest, Jackson County, North Carolina 

According to the U.S. Forest Service, "With a 411-foot plunge, Upper Whitewater Falls in North Carolina is the highest waterfall east of the Rockies."

 Lower Whitewater Falls - the shorter of the two falls , Sumter National Forest, Oconee County, South Carolina

References

External links 

 Description and photos of Lower Whitewater Falls from SCwaterfalls website
 Description and photos of Upper Whitewater Falls from SCwaterfalls website

Protected areas of Oconee County, South Carolina